Ian Russell (born 10 August 1965) is an Australian former professional rugby league footballer who played in the 1980s and 1990s.

Playing career
A Mittagong Lions junior of Indigenous descent, Russell won an under-18 Grand Final with club in 1983 and played A Grade for them in 1984 before joining the Illawarra Steelers.

Illawarra Steelers
In Round 6 of the 1986 NSWRL season, Russell made his first grade debut for Illawarra in a 22–8 win over the St George Dragons. In 1987, after just one game for the Steelers, Russell was released from the club when he returned to Mittagong. 

In 1988, Russell was invited back to the club and, although he could not force his way into their top side at first, he became a key player for the team.  In 1990, he was named the Steelers' Player of the Year, was named in the Australian train-on squad and finished fourth in Rothmans Medal voting. In 1991, he once again won the Steelers' Player of the Year award and represented NSW Country Origin, starting at lock in their 12–22 loss to City. In the Australian summer of 1990–91, Russell spent time with the Sheffield Eagles in the English Championship, scoring three tries.

In 1992, a hamstring injury saw him miss the finals series, a major blow to the Steelers, Despite the injury, he won the Dally M Lock of the Year award. Over the next two seasons, injuries restricted him to just 18 games. He ended his time with Illawarra having played 115 games, finishing as the club's 10th most capped player.

North Queensland Cowboys
In 1995, Russell joined the newly-established North Queensland Cowboys. He started at lock in their inaugural game against the Sydney Bulldogs, but played just 11 games in the club's first season. In 1996, Russell played just one game for the club before being sacked for disciplinary reasons.

Paris Saint-Germain
In 1996, after departing the Cowboys, Russell joined Paris Saint-Germain for their first season in the Super League, playing three games for the club.

Oldham Bears
In 1997, Russell joined the Oldham Bears, playing six games for the club.

Achievements and accolades

Individual
Dally M Lock of the Year: 1992
Illawarra Steelers Player of the Year: 1990, 1991
Illawarra Steelers 25th Anniversary Team of Steel

Statistics

NSWRL/ARL

Championship/Super League

Post-playing career
In 2006, Russell was named at lock in the Illawarra Steelers 25th Anniversary Team of Steel.

Personal life
Russell's son, Tate, is a professional soccer player and currently plays for the Western Sydney Wanderers in the A-League.

References

External links
Statistics at orl-heritagetrust.org.uk

1965 births
Living people
Australian expatriate rugby league players
Australian expatriate sportspeople in England
Australian expatriate sportspeople in France
Australian rugby league players
Country New South Wales Origin rugby league team players
Expatriate rugby league players in England
Expatriate rugby league players in France
Illawarra Steelers players
Indigenous Australian rugby league players
North Queensland Cowboys players
Oldham R.L.F.C. players
Paris Saint-Germain Rugby League players
Rugby league locks
Rugby league players from Taree
Rugby league second-rows